The Rajput Regiment is one of the oldest infantry regiments of the Indian Army, tracing its origins back to 1778 with the raising of the 24th Regiment of Bengal Native Infantry. The 1st battalion of the regiment was formed in 1798. 

After World War I, the Indian Army was restructured and most Rajput regiments became battalions of the 7th Rajput Regiment. These included the 2nd Queen Victoria's Own, 4th Prince Albert Victor's, 7th (Duke of Connaught's Own), and 11th Rajputs.

Before India gained independence from the British Empire, the regiment consisted of Rajputs and Punjabi Muslims. After 1947, the regiment started recruiting from other groups as well, although 50% of the regiment was made up of Rajputs. The rest of the regiment was made up of Gurjar's along with Brahmin's and Jat's. Now, the regiment primarily consists of troops from the Rajput communities and from other communities like Brahmins, Jats, Muslim and Ahirs.  The regimental insignia is a pair of crossed Rajputi Katar's flanked by three Ashoka leaves on either side. The Lion Capital of Ashoka is mounted on top and a scroll below with the words "The Rajput Regiment".

Operations

World War I 
Most of the Rajput battalions saw action during the First World War. The 1st battalion fought at the Battle of Dujailah in South of Kut (present-day Iraq) and was nearly annihilated. The 3rd battalion fought the Battles of Qurna and Kut-al-Amara against the Turks. In one of the battles, the Turks had invaded both the flanks of the 3rd Rajput, during which Jemadar Sital Baksh was severely wounded. Sepoy Jhandu Singh rushed to his rescue and was awarded a posthumous Indian Order of Merit and Médaille militaire.

Interwar Period 
In 1922 the infantry regiments of the British Indian Army were reorganised and all the Rajput regiments (with the exception of the 13th (Shekhawati) Rajput Infantry, which became the 10th battalion of the 6th Rajputana Rifles) were amalgamated to become battalions of the new 7th Rajput Regiment as follows:

 1st battalion: from 2nd Queen Victoria's Own Rajput Light Infantry (1911–1922)

2nd battalion: from 4th Prince Albert Victor's Rajputs (1901–1922)

3rd battalion: from 7th (Duke of Connaught's Own) Rajput Infantry (1903–1922)

4th battalion: from 8th Rajput Infantry (1901–1922)

5th battalion: from 11th Rajput Infantry (1901–1922)

10th (Training) battalion: from the 16th Rajput Infantry (The Lucknow Regiment) (1901–1922)
Also the one-class characteristics of most of the infantry regiments were changed ,and the Rajputs introduced a company each of Punjabi Muslims and Hindustani Muslims in each of their battalions.

In late 1936 and 1937, the 3rd battalion ( 3/7 Rajput), was posted to Waziristan in what is now the tribal areas of Pakistan.  During that time, they were employed against Afghan insurgents and criminal gangs raiding across the border.

World War II 

A number of Rajput battalions participated in World War II:

The 1st battalion was in the Arakan during the Burma campaign and later took over the defence of the Andaman & Nicobar Islands.

The 2nd battalion was also in the Arakan area and a number of battles were fought by it. The capture of Point 551, also called Rajput Hill, was the most important. The Japanese forces holding this feature had repelled attacks by other battalions, but the Rajputs managed to capture the hill, winning an Indian Order of Merit, five Military Crosses and two Military Medals for this action.

The 3rd battalion was shipped by convoy to Egypt in August and September 1940. Their convoy was attacked several times by Italian bombers operating out of Ethiopia. The battalion's Bren guns were deployed for air defence and on one occasion are believed to have brought down an Italian aircraft. The battalion was at Suez and Egypt and was sent to defend Cyprus after the German attack on Crete as part of the Indian 5th Infantry Division's 161st Indian Infantry Brigade. Here, they were mainly used in an anti-parachute role, supported by elements of Australian armour. Later, they returned to Egypt and participated in fierce fighting around Deir el Shein and Ruweisat Ridge, including a particularly difficult offensive on July 21 and 22, 1942, where they took many casualties including the commanding officer. On 6 August Sikandar Hayat Khan, Premier of the Punjab, visited the battalion and having inspected the P.M.s of the battalion addressed them. He spoke mainly on what the Indian Army had done and was doing, and also generally on the condition in the Punjab. Later in the year the battalion participated in the Second Battle of El Alamein.

The 4th battalion was also involved in the Western Desert Campaign at Sidi Barrani and El Alamein and on its return to India was posted to the Kohima front.

The 5th battalion fought in the Battle of Hong Kong. The action against the invading Japanese was short and swift with heavy casualties to the battalion. The battalion along with the British garrison was forced to surrender and the men became prisoners of war and had to undergo great hardships. 130 men of 5/7 Rajput were either beaten or starved to death or died because of a lack of medical care. The Japanese wanted Capt. Mateen Ahmed Ansari of the battalion to renounce his allegiance to the British, but he refused. For five months he was subjected to brutal beatings and treatment, as a result of which he could not walk. He was then sent to live with the other ranks instead of the officers. Capt. Ansari remained true to the regiment and organised a system for helping escapees. He was again put in jail and tortured but refused to be broken. In the end the Japanese executed him. Capt. Ansari was awarded the George Cross for his heroism.

1947–48 Jammu & Kashmir Operations 

At the time of partition in 1947, Punjabi and Bengali Muslims who formed up to 50% of the strength in most battalions were transferred to the Pakistan Army. The gaps created by their departure were filled in by Gurjars, who came over from the Punjab Regiments which were allotted to Pakistan. The numeral prefix (7) was removed from the regiment's name and it became the Rajput Regiment.

Four Rajput battalions (1st, 2nd, 3rd and 4th) participated in the 1947–48 operations in Jammu & Kashmir. 3 Rajput was the first to be inducted. Its original task was to protect Ramban and Jammu, but it quickly came under the 50th Parachute Brigade for its relief of Jhangar and Kotli. The advance from Jhangar to Kotli took five days, as the column had to clear 47 road blocks. After the relief of Kotli the column returned to Naushera. 1 Rajput was inducted next and it also formed a part of the 50th Parachute Brigade at Naushera. It had its share of fighting in clearing the raiders from some hill features around Naushera. The raiders meanwhile kept heavy pressure on the Naushera-Jhangar road and both 1 and 3 Rajput fought a number of engagements to keep the road open. In December 1947, 4 Rajput were inducted and deployed in the Chammb-Akhnoor area. 2 Rajput came in next and were employed for lines of communication duties around Jammu.

Aggressive patrolling was done by 1 and 3 Rajputs around Naushera and Kot. On February  ,y 194,8 a strong patrol was sent out in the area east of Naushera. The patrol was surrounded by an enemy force of approximately 1000 men. Soon a fierce fight started which continued for seven hours. During this time Subedar Gopal Singh's platoon came under heavy pressure. Gopal Singh, wounded thrice, kept reorganizing his men time and again. At one time Gopal Singh got separated from his platoon and had only three men at his side, one of them being Sep. Sikdar Singh. When things got tough Sub. Gopal Singh led a bayonet charge during which he was seriously wounded. Sikdar Singh picked him up and carried him back to the main patrol area. Hav. Mahadeo Singh was another hero. He kept on supplying ammunition to the Bren gunners of the platoon, and a couple of times he walked through heavy enemy fire to get the ammunition through. In one of his attempts he was wounded and fell down, but when he scrambled to his feet he was riddled with bullets. In this action the 3 Rajputs won 3 Vir Chakras – one each to Sub. Gopal Singh and Sep. Sikdar Singh and a posthumous one to Hav. Mahadeo Singh.

After the fall of Jhangar, Naushera became the enemy's next objective. Brig. Mohammad Usman, the 50th Parachute Brigade commander, closely watched the situation and drew up defensive plans in which the Rajputs were holding tactical ground around Naushera. C Company, 1 Rajput was holding the Taindhar position, which was vital for the defence of Naushera. Brig. Usman had directed C Coy to hold this position at any cost in case of an attack. In the early morning hours of February 6, 1948, the enemy attacked the Taindhar position. The enemy was about 1500 strong and consisted mostly of Pathans with some Pakistani servicemen. The enemy attacked in waves of lines of 200–300 men. Six such attacks were launched and there was heavy hand-to-hand fighting in some posts. Hav. Daya Ram who was then manning the 3-inch mortar detachment realised that the enemy had gotten very close to the defensive positions. He took the secondary charge out of the mortar bombs, elevated the mortars to their maximum limit and fired the bombs. These bombs landed within 30–50 yards of the Rajput defensive positions and caused havoc among the enemy. Some of the enemies switched and attacked Daya Ram's section, but the position held. Daya Ram was wounded and his Bren gunner was killed. He then picked up the Bren gun and started firing at the enemy. For his courageous actions, Daya Ram was awarded the Maha Vir Chakra.

The left flank of C Coy gave an easy approach to the enemy. This sector was defended by Nk. Jadunath Singh and his section. The enemy after failing in the frontal attacks switched the main effort on this sector. Jadunath Singh effectively directed the fire of his Bren gun, rifles and grenades. The enemy, however still continued to advance. Jadunath Singh rushed out of his defensive position throwing hand grenades and firing his Sten gun, taking the enemy by surprise and forcing them to withdraw to regroup. The enemy charged again, but Jadunath Singh again stood firm and charged out. He was wounded this time but the attack failed again. By this time his section had suffered heavy casualties. The enemy attacked again and Jadunath Singh charged out for the third time, firing his Sten gun and hurling grenades. He was hit by two bullets, one in the head and another in the chest and at last fell. The enemy had lost heart after this and withdrew, leaving behind a large number of dead and wounded. For his gallantry, Jadunath Singh was posthumously awarded the Param Vir Chakra.

1962 Sino-Indian War 

Two Rajput battalions witnessed some heavy fighting in the North-East Frontier Agency (NEFA) in 1962. 2 Rajput, under the command of Lt. Col. M.S. Rikh, were at Walong in early 1962 and were moved to the banks of the Namka Chu river by 10 October as a part of 7 Infantry Brigade. The brigade was stretched on a twelve-mile front along the Namka Chu, with the marching time from one end to the other being five days. The site chosen for their defences was forced upon them by the corps commander, who was working directly with the political authorities instead of the military chain of command. The battalion took up hastily erected defensive positions along the Namka Chu. The battalion was deployed in a trackless wilderness, where no mules could go and no civilian population lived which could help logistically. Lack of winter clothing added to the hardships of the men on these snowy heights. By the time the fighting commenced, the Chinese had occupied all the dominating heights in the area. A massive assault came on the Rajput front and in the fierce fighting that ensured, the battalion repulsed a number of determined attacks. The positions were soon enveloped from both sides and the battalion was cut off. In spite of heavy odds against them the men of 2 Rajput did not give in and fought until the end.

The story of gallantry beyond the call of duty was re-enacted in many platoons and companies. At the temporary bridge, Nk. Roshan Singh's section clung doggedly to its position till every man was killed. Sub. Dasrath Singh's platoon was reduced to seven men and had exhausted its ammunition in repulsing three Chinese attacks. When the fourth Chinese attack came the Rajputs fixed bayonets and charged. In the ensuing hand-to-hand fighting four men were killed and the three survivors all seriously wounded were captured. Jemadar Bose's platoon was left with only 10 men after halting three Chinese attacks. He too fixed bayonets and charged. He along with most of his platoon were killed.

Maj. B.K. Pant's company held fast against three waves of Chinese assaults and had suffered heavy casualties. Pant himself was wounded in the stomach and legs, yet he continued to lead and inspire his men, exhorting them to fight till the end to the last man. The Chinese, sensing that their obstacle in taking 2 Rajput's position lay with Maj. Pant, brought a volley of machine-gun fire on his position, killing him instantly. His last words were "Men of the Rajput Regiment, you were born to die for your country. God has selected this small river for which you must die. Stand up and fight like true Rajputs." He died proudly shouting the Rajput war cry, "Bajrang Bali ki Jai". Maj. Pant's company of 112 men had 82 killed and wounded.

Not a single man from B, C or D Coys was awarded any gallantry medal as there was no one left to write the citations because there was no officer or JCO who was not killed or seriously wounded and taken POW. When the CO, Lt. Col. M.S. Rikh was released from the POW camp, he wrote up the citations but the Indian government and Ministry of Defence made excuses and did not pay any attention to them. There is a memorial erected to those who fought at Namka Chu, which is a tin shed with names still missing from it and names of people who were not present there have been put up.

Out of 513 all ranks of 2 Rajput in battle, 282 were killed and 81 were wounded and captured. 90 others were taken prisoners when they tried to break out. Only 60 other ranks, mostly from the administrative elements, got back.

4 Rajput under Lt. Col. B. Avasthi was in the Sela-Bomdila area and it too had to face heavy odds. There was conflicting views among the senior commanders. The brigade commander wanted to hold Sela, but the divisional commander wanted to fall back. The divisional commander and the corps commander both agreed to withdraw. This led to total chaos during the retreat as the Chinese had bypassed many positions and ambushed parties of the soldiers withdrawing in a number of places. The battalion broke up into a number of parties, one led by Lt. Col. Avasti was ambushed and he was killed along with 300 men.

1965 Indo-Pakistani War 

After the Rann of Kutch affair, Pakistan switched its attempts towards Kargil and in May 1965 it attacked one of the Indian posts there. 4 Rajput as a part of 121 Infantry Brigade were ordered to capture Point 13620 and Black Rock (15000) also known as Kargil heights to remove any threat to the Srinagar-Leh highway. Both posts consisted of three parts and each of these features was held by a platoon plus of the enemy in addition to a section of 3" mortars and MMGs on Point 13620. On 17 May 1965, B Coy under Maj. Baljit Singh Randhawa infiltrated deep behind the enemy held posts and attacked them. A grim battles was the fought and the Rajputs were successful in evicting the enemy. Maj. Randhawa was killed in the action and was posthumously awarded a Maha Vir Chakra. 3 Vir Chakras were also awarded to the company, one each to Capt. Ranbir Singh, Sep. Budh Singh and a posthumous one to Hav. Girdhari Lal. Black Rock was captured by A Coy in the second phase of the attack. As an act of goodwill by the Indian government these posts were handed back to the Pakistanis some weeks later. These were again recaptured by another battalion in August 1965.

In August, 4 Rajput were moved to the Hajipir area and Bisali feature was captured by them on the night of 4/5 September. This assault was carried out in face of heavy MMG, mortar and artillery fire. The Pakistanis launched five counterattacks and all these were beaten back. By this time the Rajputs had nearly exhausted all of their ammunition and with no hope of reinforcements, they had to withdraw to other defensive positions.

6 Rajput were in and around Srinagar dealing with the Pakistani infiltrators. A number of raids and ambushes were systematically carried out by them. After the infiltrator menace had died down, 6 Rajput moved to the Akhnoor area and came under 191 Infantry Brigade, which in turn was directly under HQ 15 corps. The battalion was supplied with RCL guns but without sights. When asking for the sights they were told to "see through the barrels and engage the Pakistani armour". The battalion held on to a number of forward posts in the area in the face of repeated counterattacks and heavy shelling. Some time after the cease fire a Brigadier came around to see the 6 Rajput defences. He asked Nk. Nanak Singh, who was in charge of an LMG position as to where his range card was, and how could he fire properly without knowing his primary and secondary arcs. Nanak Singh replied that he would fire at wherever the enemy came from. This annoyed the Brigadier and he said that Nanak Singh was not a good NCO. Nanak Singh faced the Brigadier and said, "Sahib, jab golian chal rahi theen to dikhai nahin diye. Ab range card poochh rahe ho." (Sir, when the bullets were flying you were nowhere to be seen and now you are asking for the range card!). That ended the matter.

14 and 20 Rajput were at the Phillora-Chawinda front and after the capture of Charwa on the border, 20 Rajput led the advance for the next 10 days. 17 Rajput were in the southern Lahore sector in the Bedian area.

1971 Indo-Pakistani War 

Rajput battalions played an active part in Indo-Pakistani War of 1971. Starting in West Bengal, near Calcutta and going about in a clockwise direction around Bangladesh the battalions were deployed as follows.

22 Rajput captured Akandabaria and cleared the way to capture Darsana. It then led the brigade attack on Kushtia. The Pakistanis had built up the area around Kushtia and they let the Rajputs and the supporting tanks come forward into the area. They then opened up with heavy fire, and the leading company of the Rajputs suffered heavy casualties.

16 Rajput participated in the Battle of Hilli and then led the brigade advance to Ghoraghat and on to Rangpur. 21 Rajput (also Known as Veer Ekkis Rajput) spearheaded the move to Saidpur and fought in the battle of Panchagarh and Khansama during which there was fierce hand-to-hand fighting. 4 Rajput were in the area Kurigram-Kaligunj-Jaipurhat. 6 Rajput fought in the Sylhet area and led the advance towards Fenchuganj and Kola Bils. Heavy fighting took place at Kola Bils and the battalion suffered 100 casualties, but it obtained the surrender of the Pakistan Army's 22nd battalion, Baloch Regiment. The battalion was awarded one Vir Chakra (posthumous) and 2 Sena Medals for the action at Kola Bils.

18 Rajput were on the Akhaura-Ashuganj axis. Akhaura proved a tough nut to crack, fighting for it took nearly three days. After this the Rajputs rushed forward and captured the Titas bridge intact. They then attacked Ashuganj, which was cleared after a tough fight and moved on to Narsingdi and entered Dacca on 16 December. 20 Rajput operated in the Belonia bulge and captured Chauddagram and later moved to Chittagong.

On the western front, 20 Rajput (Jodhpur Sardar) were in their element in the sands of Rajasthan. Covering a distance of 70 km in the first five days of the war the Rajputs reached Chachro. 15 Rajput was in the Fazilka area. It was involved in heavy fighting for the capture of Beriwala bridge and Ghazi post. It suffered heavy casualties during the attacks. L/Nk. Drigpal Singh received a posthumous Maha Vir Chakra for his gallant actions. 14 Rajput saw action in the Khalra sector and 5 and 9 Rajputs were in the Chammb area. 9 Rajput operated in the Ratnu Chak area and carried out a number of raids, they also captured a couple of enemy posts.

1980 – present 

Since the 1980s a number of Rajput battalions have been involved in counterinsurgency operations in the North East, Punjab and Jammu and Kashmir. 4, 5 and 25 Rajput formed a part of Indian Peacekeeping Force in Sri Lanka. In 1980, 18 Rajput transferred to the newly raised Mechanised Infantry Regiment as its 13th battalion. The 27th battalion of the regiment was raised at Fatehgarh, Uttar Pradesh, in 1988. Its motto is Sarvada Sarv Shersht.  27 Rajput were involved in operations during the Kargil War in 1999 and captured Point 5770. After the Kargil War the battalion moved to Ethiopia and Eritrea as a part of a United Nations Mission (UNMEE).

The Rajput Regimental center is in Fatehgarh, Uttar Pradesh. A war memorial was erected at Fatehgarh in 1932. It is in a form of a chattri, with its dome resting on six pillars, each representing a battalion at that time and bearing its crest. The regimental motto is Sarvatra Vijaya, which means Victory Everywhere and the war cry is Bol Bajrang Bali Ki Jai, meaning Victory to Lord Hanuman.

Gallantry awards 
The honours and awards tally for the Rajput Regiment is as follows:
Pre-Independence: 1 Victoria Cross, 1 George Cross, 10 Distinguished Service Order, 33 Military Cross, 10 Indian Order of Merit, 27 Military Medals and 46 Indian Distinguished Service Medals.
Post-Independence: 1 Param Vir Chakra, 3 Ashoka Chakras, 7 Maha Vir Chakras, 15 Kirti Chakras, 66 Vir Chakras, 20 Shaurya Chakras, 313 Sena Medals and 8 Yudh Seva Medals.

Affiliation 
The affiliation between Indian Navy ships and Indian Army regiments was instituted in 1990 when the guided missile destroyer INS Rajput was affiliated to the Rajput Regiment. The ship was decommissioned from service on 21 May 2021.

See also 
 Indian Army
 Armed Forces of India
 British Indian Army
 British Army
 Rajputs
 INS Rajput
 History of Rajputs

Notes

References 

Bharat-Rakshak Monitor issue on the Rajput Regiment
 

R
R
Military units and formations established in 1947